Zimbo Comes To Town is a 1960 Hindi-language film starring Chitra, Shammi and Bhagwan. It was made under the banner of Combine F. Traders. The film was released on 1 January 1960.

The film was dubbed into Tamil with the title Nagarathil Zimbo and released in 1961.

Cast
 Chitra
 Shammi
 Bhagwan Dada
 Azad
 Bhagwan Dada
 Habib

Music
"Mausam Bada Rangeela" - Geeta Dutt
"Nazaro Ne Maara Hum Kya Kare" - Mohammed Rafi
"Dil Hai Tera Deewana" - Geeta Dutt
"Dekh Mera Dil Na Jala" - Geeta Dutt, Mohammed Rafi
"Thandi Hawao Kali Ghatao" - Usha Mangeshkar
"Itna To Bata De Aye Dil" - Lata Mangeshkar
"Yeh Toh Pyar Bhari Duniya Hai" - Lata Mangeshkar

Songlist (Tamil)
Music by Vijaya Bhaskar. Lyrics were penned by Kuyilan.

Songlist (Telugu)
Music by Vijaya Bhaskar. Lyrics were penned by Sri Sri.

References

External links

1960s Hindi-language films
Films scored by Chitragupta